Ruth Mace FBA (born 9 October 1961) is a British anthropologist, biologist, and academic. She specialises in the evolutionary ecology of human demography and life history, and phylogenetic approaches to culture and language evolution. Since 2004, she has been Professor of Evolutionary Anthropology at University College London.

Early life and education
Mace was born on 9 October 1961 in London, England to David Mace and Angela Mace. She was educated at South Hampstead High School, an all-girls private school in South Hampstead, London, and at Westminster School, an independent school within the precincts of Westminster Abbey that has a mixed-sex sixth form. She studied zoology at Wadham College, Oxford, graduating with a Bachelor of Arts (BA) degree in 1983 and a Doctor of Philosophy (DPhil) degree in 1987. Her doctoral thesis was titled "The dawn chorus: Behavioural organisation in the great tit (Parus major)".

Academic career
Having completed her doctorate, Mace began her academic career as a research fellow at Imperial College London; she held a NERC Postdoctoral Fellowship. Then, from 1989 to 1991, she was a lecturer in the School of Development Studies at the University of East Anglia.

In 1991, Mace moved to the Department of Anthropology of University College London: she was a Royal Society University Research Fellow and Lecturer from 1991 to 1999, and Reader in Human Evolutionary Ecology from 1999 to 2004. In 1994, having met Mark Pagel at University College, the two co-authored  "The Comparative Method in Anthropology", that used phylogenetic methods to analyse human cultures, pioneering a new field of science — using evolutionary trees, or phylogenies, in anthropology, to explain human behaviour.

In 2004, she was appointed Professor of Evolutionary Anthropology. From 2005 to 2010, she was also Editor-in-Chief of Evolution and Human Behavior. From 2018, she was the founding Editor-in-Chief of Evolutionary Human Sciences. Since 2010, she has served as Head of Biological Anthropology at University College London.

Personal life
Mace's partner is Mark Pagel, professor of Evolutionary Biology at the University of Reading. Together they have two sons.

Honours
In 2003, Mace gave the Curl Lecture, a prize lectureship of the Royal Anthropological Institute. In 2008, she was elected a Fellow of the British Academy (FBA), the United Kingdom's national academy for the humanities and the social sciences.

Selected works

References

1961 births
20th-century anthropologists
21st-century anthropologists
20th-century British biologists
21st-century British biologists
20th-century British writers
21st-century British writers
20th-century British women writers
21st-century British women writers
20th-century British women scientists
21st-century British women scientists
Academics of Imperial College London
Academics of the University of East Anglia
Academics of University College London
Alumni of Wadham College, Oxford
British anthropologists
British women biologists
British evolutionary biologists
Fellows of the British Academy
Human evolution theorists
Living people
People educated at South Hampstead High School
People educated at Westminster School, London
Physical anthropologists
Scientists from London
British women anthropologists